Doliops pachyrrhynchoides is a species of beetle in the family Cerambycidae. It was described by Heller in 1916.

References

Doliops
Beetles described in 1916